Huis ten Bosch (English: "House in the Woods") is a royal palace in The Hague, Netherlands. It is one of three official residences of the Dutch monarch; the two others being the Noordeinde Palace in The Hague and the Royal Palace in Amsterdam.

Huis ten Bosch was the home of Queen Beatrix from 1981 to her abdication in 2014; King Willem-Alexander and his family moved in on 13 January 2019. A replica of the palace was built in Sasebo, Japan, in a theme park bearing the same name.

History

17th and 18th century
Construction of Huis ten Bosch began on 2 September 1645, under the direction of Bartholomeus Drijffhout, and to a design by Pieter Post and Jacob van Campen. It was commissioned by Amalia of Solms-Braunfels, the wife of stadtholder Frederick Henry, on a parcel of land granted to her by the States General  (Loonstra 1983, Slothouwer 1945).  The first stone was laid by Elizabeth of Bohemia.

After her husband's death in 1647, Amalia dedicated the palace to him. Led by the architect-painters Jacob van Campen and Pieter Post, other major artists of the day, such as Gerard van Honthorst, Jacob Jordaens, Thomas Willeboirts Bosschaert, Theodoor van Thulden, Caesar van Everdingen, Salomon de Bray, Pieter Soutman, Gonzales Coques, Pieter de Grebber, Adriaen Hanneman, Pieter Hermansz Verelst  and Jan Lievens, filled the Oranjezaal ("Orange Hall" ) with paintings glorifying the late prince. Between 1734 and 1737 the architect Daniel Marot added two wings to the palace, including a new dining room.

Over the next century and a half, the palace would change possession from the Nassau family, the king of Prussia, and many stadtholders until the Batavian Revolution in 1795. The government of the newly created Batavian Republic gave the palace to the Batavian (Dutch) people who still own it to this day.

19th and 20th century

The National Art Gallery, predecessor of the Rijksmuseum, was housed in the building from 1800 to 1805. Napoleon Bonaparte's brother, Louis, king of Holland, briefly lived in the palace between 1805 and 1807.

When William Frederick, Prince of Orange-Nassau, the only surviving son of the last stadtholder, was proclaimed King of the Netherlands as William I in 1815, he made Huis ten Bosch Palace one of his official residences. It became a favourite location for many members of the royal family. In 1899 the palace was the site of several meetings of the First International Peace Conference at The Hague. During World War I it became the primary residence of Queen Wilhelmina.

Queen Wilhelmina and her family were forced to evacuate the palace for Britain (from which the queen's family, but not the queen herself, would move on to Canada) when the German army invaded the Netherlands during World War II. The Nazi administration planned to demolish the palace, but the controller convinced them otherwise.  However, the palace was damaged beyond habitation.

Between 1950 and 1956, the palace was restored and once again became a royal residence.  It became the prime residence once more in 1981.

The palace has undergone major reconstructions since it was built. Currently, it consists of a central part with two long wings, spanning approximately 110 meters from end to end.

References

External links

 
Huis ten Bosch at the official website of the Dutch Royal Family

Houses completed in the 17th century
Royal residences in the Netherlands
Baroque palaces in the Netherlands
Palaces in the Netherlands
Official residences in the Netherlands
Buildings of the Dutch Golden Age
Rijksmonuments in The Hague